G. montana my refer to:

Gorybia montana, beetle of the family Cerambycidae
Grouvellina montana, ground beetle of the subfamily Rhysodinae